The Tayandu or Tayando Islands (Indonesian: Kepulauan Tayando) are a group of low-lying islands just west of the larger Kai Islands of Maluku, Indonesia.  The main group consists of Tayando (with villages Yamru and Ohoiel), Walir, Heniar (with village Tayando Yamtel) and several smaller isle-lets. Between Walir and Taam (further south) is Pulau Nusreen (5°42'14"S, 132°16'5"E) featuring a large sandy lagoon. Manggur is further west with Kur and Kaimeer islands north of it. Administratively they comprise a district (kecamatan) within the city of Tual.

External links

Languages of Indonesia (Maluku)

Archipelagoes of Indonesia
Islands of the Maluku Islands
Landforms of Maluku (province)